The Italian Baseball League (IBL;) is a professional baseball league that is governed by FIBS (Italian Baseball & Softball Federation), which has its headquarters in Rome. The IBL is a wood bat league in which both composite and aluminum bats are prohibited; the official ball of the IBL is the Wilson 1010 Italy.

Until 2010, the IBL featured a league format that demoted the last place finisher to the minor leagues (Series A2), while the Series A2 champion would be promoted into the IBL.  However, in late 2009 FIBS approved the decision to eliminate the promotion and relegation system starting with the 2010 season and thus now applies a fixed-team franchise format similar to that found in Major League Baseball.

The current IBL consists of ten teams, each contesting 42 games; a team plays two 3-game series against every other team. The four teams that finish with the best regular season record qualify for a round-robin playoff. The first and second-place finishers of the round-robin are cast into the best-of-7-games Italian Baseball Series and compete for the championship, referred to as the Scudetto.

IBL players

For the 2010 season, FIBS maintained the number of sport visas granted to non-EU import foreign players at 4 per team. Per EU and Olympic Committee directive, EU citizens will have the same player rights of Italian passport holders. FIBS, however, will continue to enforce the regulation on the Italian School of Baseball that requires six ASI (Associazioni Sportive Sociali Italiane) players be on the field at all times of every game, including the pitcher in either game 2 or 3 of each series.

An Italian player is classified as Italian School of Baseball, or ASI, only if he has been developed in Italy or if has played six seasons in the Italian Leagues.

EU citizens have the same rights of the players who hold Italian citizenship but were not developed in Italy.

One particular case of the ASI rule would be a foreigner who developed as a baseball player in Italy (started playing as an U15). This is the case of a foreigner who is also an ASI, but will be able to play only respecting the limitation on import players.

Three-game series format
Game 1 of each three-game series is classified as the Foreign Affair Game, with the pitcher's mound free to be occupied by any pitcher including foreign imports.

In either Game 2 or Game 3, an EU pitcher may be the starting pitcher; however, IBL rules require that an ASI be the starting pitcher for one of these two remaining games.  Moreover, whichever game a manager selects the ASI as the starting pitcher, then all subsequent pitchers must be ASI.  Therefore, there may be ASI vs EU match-ups for the first time beginning in 2010.

Half of the teams are based in the Emilia-Romagna region of Italy.  A team from the Republic of San Marino also plays in the IBL.  Like Japanese baseball, many of the official team names contain the name of the team's corporate sponsor.

Current teams (2020 season)

Champions

Pre-playoff era

Playoff era

Defunct teams
Orel Anzio

Notable former players
 Jason Simontacchi: Pitcher for Novara Baseball and retired Major League Baseball pitcher
 Chuck Carr: Centerfielder for Rimini and retired Major League Baseball outfielder
 Junior Guerra: Pitcher for T & A San Marino before joining the Milwaukee Brewers
 Robel García: Infielder for Fortitudo Bologna before joining the Chicago Cubs
 Abraham Núñez: Outfielder for The Nettuno Baseball Club and retired Major League Baseball outfielder

References

External links
 FIBS Federazione Italiana Baseball Softball website
 Italian Baseball League Encyclopedia and History Baseball Reference website

See also
 Baseball in Italy
 Italian Baseball League 2D
 Italy national baseball team
 Baseball awards in Italy
 Baseball awards in Europe

1948 establishments in Italy
Baseball competitions in Italy
Baseball leagues in Europe
 
Sports leagues established in 1948